Lake Geneva is a city in the U.S. state of Wisconsin. Located in Walworth County and situated on Geneva Lake, it was home to 8,277 people as of the 2020 census, up from 7,651 at the 2010 census. It is about 40 miles southwest of Milwaukee and 65 miles northwest of Chicago.  

Given its relative proximity to the Chicago and Milwaukee metropolitan areas, Lake Geneva has become a popular resort city that thrives on tourism. Since the late 19th century, it has been home to numerous lakefront mansions owned by wealthy Chicagoans as second homes, leading it to be nicknamed the "Newport of the West".

History
Originally called "Maunk-suck" (Big Foot) for the Potawatomi leader who lived on the lake in the first half of the 19th century, the city was later named Geneva after the town of Geneva, New York, on Seneca Lake, to which government surveyor John Brink saw a resemblance. To avoid confusion with the nearby town of Geneva, Wisconsin, it was renamed Lake Geneva. The abutting lake is named Geneva Lake.

After the Great Chicago Fire of 1871, a number of wealthy and prominent Chicago industrialists fled to the shores of Geneva Lake—then a popular summer camp destination—by train. Many of the families built palatial summer homes on the lake, which led it to be nicknamed the "Newport of the West". Lake Geneva remains a popular summer tourism destination for boating, water sports, and viewing the mansions, which can be seen from the public Geneva Lake Shore Path. Two historic Lake Geneva mansions are open to the public: the Baker House, built in 1885, a bed-and-breakfast, and Black Point, the lakefront summer estate built for beer baron Conrad Seipp in 1888 in the nearby town of Linn, a Wisconsin Historical Society museum.Other famous residents who built or have owned mansions on Geneva Lake include the Wrigleys, the Schwinns, Otto Young, and Richard Driehaus.

In 1954, Lake Geneva was one of the three finalists for the location of the new United States Air Force Academy, but lost to Colorado Springs, Colorado.

In 1968, Hugh Hefner built his first Playboy resort in Lake Geneva. It closed in 1981 and was converted in 1982 to the Americana Resort, and in 1993 to the Grand Geneva Resort.

Royal Recorders (formerly Shade Tree Studios) was a Lake Geneva music recording studio where artists such as Ministry from Chicago, Psalm 69: The Way to Succeed and the Way to Suck Eggs album '92; Cheap Trick from Rockford, Illinois, Standing on the Edge album '85; Queensrÿche, Empire 1990; Crash Test Dummies "Mmm Mmm Mmm Mmm" in '93; Iron Maiden, Nine Inch Nails from Cleveland Broken (Nine Inch Nails EP) in '92; and Skid Row recorded albums.

Lake Geneva was also home to TSR, Inc., the original publisher of the Dungeons & Dragons roleplaying game, until its takeover by Wizards of the Coast in 1997.

Geography
Lake Geneva is located at  (42.592380, -88.434424). The city is on the northeast bay of Geneva Lake on relatively flat ground, with some steep hills and bluffs. The White River flows out of Geneva Lake for 19 miles into Burlington, Wisconsin. 

Climate

Demographics

2010 census
At the 2010 census there were 7,651 people, 3,323 households, and 1,879 families living in the city. The racial makeup of the city was 87.6% White, 0.6% African American, 0.2% Native American, 1.5% Asian, 8.5% from other races, and 1.6% from two or more races. Hispanic or Latino of any race were 17.3%.

Of the 3,323 households 27.9% had children under the age of 18 living with them, 40.2% were married couples living together, 11.3% had a female householder with no husband present, 5.0% had a male householder with no wife present, and 43.5% were non-families. 36.6% of households were one person and 15.5% were one person aged 65 or older. The average household size was 2.28 and the average family size was 3.02.

The median age was 39.8 years. 22.7% of residents were under the age of 18; 8.2% were between the ages of 18 and 24; 25.5% were from 25 to 44; 26.8% were from 45 to 64; and 16.7% were 65 or older. The gender makeup of the city was 47.5% male and 52.5% female.

2000 census
At the 2000 census there were 7,148 people, 3,053 households, and 1,801 families living in the city. The population density was 1,425.1 people per square mile (549.8/km). There were 3,757 housing units at an average density of 749.0 per square mile (289.0/km).  The racial makeup of the city was 90.81% White, 0.90% African American, 0.11% Native American, 1.08% Asian, 0.06% Pacific Islander, 5.16% from other races, and 1.89% from two or more races. Hispanic or Latino of any race were 14.75%.  At the 2010 census there were 7,651 people for a population growth of 7.04% from the 2000 United States Census to the 2010 United States Census.

Of the 3,053 households 27.8% had children under the age of 18 living with them, 45.1% were married couples living together, 9.8% had a female householder with no husband present, and 41.0% were non-families. 33.0% of households were one person and 12.8% were one person aged 65 or older. The average household size was 2.33 and the average family size was 3.01.

The age distribution was 23.0% under the age of 18, 9.8% from 18 to 24, 29.9% from 25 to 44, 22.4% from 45 to 64, and 15.0% 65 or older. The median age was 36 years. For every 100 females, there were 94.8 males. For every 100 females age 18 and over, there were 92.6 males.

The median household income was $40,924 and the median family income  was $54,543. Males had a median income of $38,930 versus $25,671 for females. The per capita income for the city was $21,536. About 4.7% of families and 7.2% of the population were below the poverty line, including 9.0% of those under age 18 and 5.5% of those age 65 or over.

2020 Census
At the 2020 census the population was 8,277.

Media

Lake Geneva's main newspaper is the Lake Geneva Regional News, a Lee Enterprises-owned weekly (published Thursdays) newspaper that has served the Lake Geneva area since 1872.

WLKG (96.1 FM) is a hot adult contemporary-formatted radio station licensed to Lake Geneva.

Government
The city of Lake Geneva operates under a mayor-council form of government. It has four aldermanic districts with two representatives per district. It is managed by a full-time City Administrator. The city has an elected city attorney and an elected municipal judge.

Parks and Recreation
Flatiron Park in Lake Geneva has the Lake Geneva Visitor Center inside its boundaries, while Seminary Park is the former site of the Lake Geneva Seminary. There is also a public beach on the shore of Geneva Lake.

Transportation
Lake Geneva is served by U.S. Route 12, as well as two Wisconsin state highways; Wisconsin Highway 50 and Wisconsin Highway 120.

Notable people

Margaret H. Bair - U.S. Air National Guard general
Robert H. Baker - Wisconsin legislator, Chairman of the Republican Party of Wisconsin
Hiram Barber, Jr. - U.S. Representative from Illinois
S. Carey - musician, member of Bon Iver
Bobby Cook - NBA player 
Gary Gygax - writer and game designer; creator of Dungeons & Dragons
M. W. Kalaher - Wisconsin legislator
John Brayshaw Kaye - poet and politician
Mary L. Kirchoff - author of Dragonlance novels
Kerwin Mathews - actor
Ryan Mathews - NASCAR driver
Buddy Melges - Olympic gold medalist, member of the America's Cup Hall of Fame
John R. Powers - author
Ralph Townsend - author
William Trinke - Wisconsin legislator
Margaret Weis - author of Dragonlance novels
Edwin A. Williams - Wisconsin legislator

References

Further reading
 Fogle, Phil. Grassroots—Lake Geneva: An Illustrated History of the Geneva Lake Area (The Centennial Book). Williams Bay, Wis.: Big Foot Publishing Company, 1986.
 Simmons, James. Annals of Lake Geneva, Wisconsin. 1835-1897. Lake Geneva, Wis.: The Herald, 1897.

External links

 City of Lake Geneva
 Geneva Lake Museum of History
 Images of Lake Geneva : Historic photographs and postcards, at the University of Wisconsin–Madison
 Sanborn fire insurance maps:  1892 1900 1912

 
Cities in Wisconsin
Cities in Walworth County, Wisconsin